The All-Ireland Senior Hurling Championship 1984 was the 98th series of the All-Ireland Senior Hurling Championship, Ireland's premier hurling knock-out competition.  Cork won the championship, beating Offaly 3–16 to 1–12 in the centenary year final at Semple Stadium, Thurles.

Centenary year

1984 was a special year in the annals of Gaelic games as it was the centenary of the foundation of the Gaelic Athletic Association.  Because of this a series of events celebrating the occasion were planned to take place throughout the year. The festivities were officially launched on 18 March at the Michael Cusack cottage in Carron, County Clare.  Ash trees were planted to mark the occasion and a plaque was also unveiled in memory of the founder of the association. The Railway Cup finals were later played in Cusack Park, Ennis.

A £100,000 film was also commissioned by the centenary committee.  Made by Louis Marcus the film was designed to be a portrait rather than a chronological history of the GAA.

One of the biggest events during the centenary celebrations was the staging of the All-Ireland final in Semple Stadium, Thurles.  It was the first time since 1937 that the championship decider did not take place in Croke Park.  The staging of the game in Thurles was a gesture to the cradle-town of the GAA and to the county regarded as 'the home of hurling'.

Pre-championship

Prior to the opening of the championship Kilkenny were installed as the favourites to retain the All-Ireland title for a third consecutive year.  The last time they achieved this was in 1913, however, no final took place that year and Kilkenny were awarded the title as Limerick refused to play.  Since then they failed to capture the 'three-in-a-row', in spite of having the opportunity in 1933 and again in 1976. Cork, the defeated All-Ireland finalists in 1982 and 1983, were regarded as the biggest threat to Kilkenny's ambitions.  1984 also provided Cork with the dubious honour of becoming the first team to lose three All-Ireland finals in-a-row.  National League champions Limerick and newcomers Offaly were also regarded as teams that would make life difficult for the reigning champions.

Teams

A total of thirteen teams contested the championship, a reduction of one team from the 1983 championship and one new entrant.

The Leinster championship was reduced to five teams as Westmeath declined to take part and instead decided to field a team in the All-Ireland Senior B Hurling Championship.  'The Lakelanders' went on to win that championship and qualified for the All-Ireland quarter-final.

Once again the five traditional hurling teams contested the Munster championship.

Antrim and Galway, two teams who faced no competition in their respective provinces, entered the championship at the All-Ireland semi-final stage.

Team summaries

Format
Munster Championship

Quarter-final: (1 match) This was a lone match between the first two teams drawn from the province of Munster.  One team was eliminated at this stage, while the winners advanced to the semi-finals.

Semi-finals: (2 matches) The winners of the lone quarter-final joined the other three Munster teams to make up the semi-final pairings.  Two teams were eliminated at this stage, while two teams advanced to the final.

Final: (1 match) The winners of the two semi-finals contested this game.  One team was eliminated at this stage, while the winners advanced to the All-Ireland semi-final.

Leinster Championship

Quarter-final: (1 match) This was a lone match between the first two teams drawn from the province of Leinster.  One team was eliminated at this stage, while the winners advanced to the semi-finals.

Semi-finals: (2 matches) The winners of the lone quarter-final joined the other three Leinster teams to make up the semi-final pairings.  Two teams were eliminated at this stage, while two teams advanced to the final.

Final: (1 match) The winner of the two semi-finals contested this game.  One team was eliminated at this stage, while the winners advanced to the All-Ireland semi-final.

All-Ireland Championship

Quarter-final: (1 match) This was a lone match between Galway and the All-Ireland 'B' champions.  One team was eliminated at this stage, while the winners advanced to the All-Ireland semi-final where they played the Leinster champions.

Semi-finals: (2 matches) The winners of the lone quarter-final joined the Leinster and Munster champions and Antrim to make up the semi-final pairings.  The Munster and Leinster champions were on opposite sides of the draw.  Two teams were eliminated at this stage, while two teams advanced to the final.

Final: (1 match) The two semi-final winners contested the final.

Fixtures

Leinster Senior Hurling Championship

Munster Senior Hurling Championship

All-Ireland Senior Hurling Championship

Championship statistics

Scoring

Widest winning margin: 24 points
Cork 3–16 : Antrim 2–5 (All-Ireland-final, 5 August 1984)
Most goals in a match: 7 
Cork 4–15 : Tipperary 3–14 (Munster final, 15 July 1984)
Most points in a match: 31 
Kilkenny 4–15 : Laois 1–16 (Leinster quarter-final, 27 May 1984)
Cork 3–16 : Antrim 2–5 (All-Ireland-final, 5 August 1984)

Top scorers

Overall

Single game

Broadcasting

The following matches were broadcast live on television in Ireland on RTÉ.

Sources

 Corry, Eoghan, The GAA Book of Lists (Hodder Headline Ireland, 2005).
 Donegan, Des, The Complete Handbook of Gaelic Games (DBA Publications Limited, 2005).
 Nolan, Pat, Flashbacks: A Half Century of Cork Hurling (The Collins Press, 2000).

External links
 Cork GAA website
 Offaly GAA website
 Gaelic Athletic Association website

See also